According to the Hebrew Bible, the kaporet ( kapōreṯ) or mercy seat was the gold lid placed on the Ark of the Covenant, with two cherubim beaten out of the ends to cover and create the space in which Yahweh appeared and dwelled. This was connected with the rituals of the Day of Atonement. The term also appears in later Jewish sources, and twice in the New Testament, from where it has significance in Christian theology.

Etymology
The etymology of kaporet is unclear. The Oxford Dictionary of the Jewish Religion states that "some translate simply 'cover'."

In Judaism

In the Hebrew Bible

According to the biblical account, the cover was made from pure gold and was the same width and breadth as the ark beneath it, 2.5 cubits long and 1.5 cubits wide.  Two golden cherubim were placed at each end of the cover facing one another and the mercy seat, with their wings spread to enclose the mercy seat. The cherubim formed a seat for Yahweh. The ark and mercy seat were kept inside the Holy of Holies, the temple's innermost sanctuary which was separated from the other parts of the temple by a thick curtain (parochet).

The Holy of Holies could be entered only by the high priest on the Day of Atonement. The high priest sprinkled the blood of a sacrificial bull onto the mercy seat as an atonement for the sins of the people of Israel.

In rabbinic tradition
After the destruction of the Second Temple, just as the Torah scroll was contained in a Torah ark (Aron HaKodesh, "Holy ark") in synagogues so also the term kaporet was applied to the valance of the parochet (Hebrew:  "curtain") on this ark.

Second Temple era sources
Hilastērion is relatively rare in classical Greek and appears largely in late writings to reference a sacrifice to appease the wrath of a deity. The term in the Septuagint was translated in the Latin Vulgate Bible with the word propitiatorium from which we get our English word propitiation.

In Christian tradition

In the New Testament

Hilastērion is found twice in the New Testament: Romans 3:25 and Hebrews 9:5.  In the passage in Romans the term is typically translated propitiation or sacrifice of atonement, whereas in the passage in Hebrews the term is typically translated mercy seat, the traditional term for the gold lid on the Ark of the Covenant. The difference in translation is explained by the different contexts. In Romans the context is the sacrificial death of Christ, whereas in the Hebrew passage the context is a description of the Holy of Holies and its contents. The Epistle to the Hebrews portrays the role of the mercy seat during Yom Kippur Day of Atonement as a prefiguration of the Passion of Christ, which was a greater atonement, and the formation of a New Covenant (Hebrews 9:3-15). The Yom Kippur ritual was a shadow of things to come (Hebrews 10:1). The continual sacrifice for sin under the Mosaic covenant became obsolete following the once-for-all sacrificial death of Christ.

In English Bibles 
The first English Bible, translated from Latin 1382, renders the term a  following the Vulgate , and in the first occurrence, Exodus 25:17, also inserts an unbracketed gloss "that is a table hiling the ark" – hiling is Middle English for "covering".

The term propitiatory was also used by J.M. Powis Smith, a Protestant, in The Complete Bible: An American Translation, published in 1939. The originally Protestant translation "mercy seat" was not followed by Ronald Knox, but has since been largely adopted also by Roman Catholic Bible versions, such as the New Jerusalem Bible (NJB) 1985.

Footnotes

References

External links
 Matthew Henry on Exodus Chapter 25
 Methods of Ancient Metallurgy

Tabernacle and Temples in Jerusalem
New Testament theology
Biblical phrases
Hebrew Bible objects
Book of Exodus
Gold objects
Ark of the Covenant
Cherubim